In computing, stress testing (sometimes called torture testing) can be applied to either hardware or software. It it used to determine the maximum capability of a computer system and is often used for purposes such as scaling for production use and ensuring reliability and stability. Stress tests typically involve running a large amount of resource-intensive processes until the system either crashes or nearly does so.

Hardware

Software

See also
 Burn-in
 Destructive testing
 Load and performance test tools
 Black box testing
 Load testing
 Software performance testing
 Scenario analysis
 Simulation
 Software testing
 White box testing
 Technischer Überwachungsverein (TÜV) – product testing and certification
 Concurrency testing using the CHESS model checker
 Jinx automates stress testing by automatically exploring unlikely execution scenarios.
 Highly accelerated life test

References

Software testing
Product testing